Charleston Catholic High School is a Catholic, coeducational high school located in eastern downtown Charleston, West Virginia, USA. CCHS was founded in 1923 and is part of the Roman Catholic Diocese of Wheeling-Charleston.

History

As early as 1869, Sacred Heart Church (founded in 1815) had established a parochial school and conducted primary grades irregularly throughout the late 1800s. In 1903, the Sisters of St. Francis of Penance and Christian Charity, of Stella Niagara, New York, assumed administration of the school. In 1923, Sacred Heart added high school grades in the former Chilton house in downtown Charleston and named the institution Sacred Heart High School. In 1940, John J. Swint, the bishop of the then Diocese of Wheeling, created Charleston Catholic High School. Area Catholics contributed to the construction of a three-story building, including science laboratories and a gymnasium, completed in 1941.  Post-war growth of Charleston led to the expansion of the school and the addition of a third floor in the 1950s. Enrollment peaked in the late 1960s and then began a slow decline in the mid-1980s.

In 1986, Father P. Edward Sadie, a local priest, hired Debra K. Sullivan as the principal. Enrollment rebounded through the 1990s. In 1994 a new math and science wing opened. In 2000, Charleston Catholic purchased and renovated the Players Club tennis building, adding basketball, volleyball, and training facilities. At the end of the 2013-14 school year and after 28 years as principal, Debra Sullivan announced her retirement, to be replaced by Colleen McCartney Hoyer of the CCHS graduating class of 1994, who previously served as Assistant Principal for Student Affairs.

Enrollment
Charleston Catholic enrolls both Christian and non-Christian students from a wide range of ethnic, racial, and socio-economic backgrounds. Students are required to follow a uniform policy.  CCHS boasts a rigorous college preparatory program for all students with an extensive offering of academic, athletic, and extracurricular programs. Its athletic teams compete with public and parochial schools in the WVSSAC Division A. Typically, 100 percent of graduating classes enroll in four-year colleges and universities.

Mission

In the context of a Christian Community, Charleston Catholic High School strives to help students fulfill the potential of their God-given talents and abilities and to guide them in developing themselves in all areas: spiritually, intellectually, physically, aesthetically, and socially. Staff, students, and parents work together to develop a community of shared values based on respect and concern for self and others while at the same time guiding students to use their gifts and values to better the world in which they live.

Awards and recognition
Charleston Catholic High School was named as having the top athletics program in West Virginia for 2008-2009 school year by Sports Illustrated.

In 2013, 65% of students in grades 9 through 12 took at least one AP exam, many taking more than one, with a total of 260 exams taken by CCHS students. Over 61.5% of the Class of 2013 took and passed an AP exam during their high school careers. The same year, 13% of the Senior Class of 2014 were named National Merit Semi-Finalists.

Members of the Charleston Catholic High School Class of 2009 were accepted and enrolled in some of the country's finest universities (including Princeton University, Harvard University, and the Wharton School of the University of Pennsylvania), had eight national merit finalists in a graduating class of only 69, and were ACRE champions. 38% of the graduating class were honored as AP scholars.

References

Roman Catholic Diocese of Wheeling-Charleston
Catholic secondary schools in West Virginia
Educational institutions established in 1923
Private middle schools in West Virginia
Schools in Kanawha County, West Virginia
1923 establishments in West Virginia